|}

The Game Spirit Chase is a Grade 2 National Hunt steeplechase in Great Britain which is open to horses aged five years or older. It is run at Newbury over a distance of about 2 miles and ½ furlong (2 miles and 92 yards, or 3,308 metres), and during its running there are thirteen fences to be jumped. The race is scheduled to take place each year in February.

The event was first run in 1953 and is named in memory of Game Spirit, a successful racehorse who was owned by the Queen Mother. During the 1970s Game Spirit won 21 races in six seasons. He also finished third in the 1974 Cheltenham Gold Cup and second in the 1976 Champion Chase. He died from a lung haemorrhage after racing at Newbury in March 1977.

The Game Spirit Chase has held Grade 2 status since 1992. Before then it was classed at Listed level and run as a limited handicap. Since 2012 the race has been sponsored by Betfair and run under various sponsored titles.

Winners

See also
 Horse racing in Great Britain
 List of British National Hunt races

References
 Racing Post:

 pedigreequery.com – Game Spirit Chase – Newbury.
 theoxfordtimes.net – "A Passion for the Races".

National Hunt races in Great Britain
Newbury Racecourse
National Hunt chases
Recurring sporting events established in 1953
1953 establishments in England